The black-nest swiftlet (Aerodramus maximus) is a species of swift in the family Apodidae. It is found in Brunei, Indonesia, Malaysia, Myanmar, the Philippines, Singapore, Thailand, and Vietnam. Its natural habitats are subtropical or tropical moist lowland forest and subtropical or tropical moist montane forest.

It is one of the main sources of edible nests for bird's nest soup.

References

black-nest swiftlet
Birds of Southeast Asia
black-nest swiftlet
Taxonomy articles created by Polbot